Lebanese Laïque Pride, also Laïque Pride, Laic Pride, or Secular Pride, is a Lebanese secularist protest movement. The movement consists of various religious and social groups that are united in their call for secularism, women's rights, and media freedom in Lebanon. They advocate for "equality among all Lebanese citizens and the separation of religion and politics." The group is opposed to political sectarianism and confessionalism in Lebanon.

Founded in either 2009 or 2010, "Lebanese Laique Pride" was originally created as a Facebook discussion thread on sectarianism. Within a matter of months, the group organized peaceful marches against sectarianism and in favor of "secular Lebanon."

In April 2010, more than 5,000 people participated in a Laïque Pride rally, calling for "an end to the country's deep-rooted sectarian system" and for a "secular Lebanon." The rally was inspired by the San Francisco gay pride marches of the 1970s, which were all about the announcement of presence and demanding rights. In the Lebanese case, their pride was about declaring the presence of and telling everyone about the existence of secular people in Lebanon whose needs were not being met. Initial demands of the movement include the enactment of a civil marriage law independent of any religious sects.

In May 2012, the movement issued demands, of which four were concerning women's rights and two were concerning media freedom. Laïque Pride also supports the enacting of a unified Civil Code for the Personal Status Law.

See also
Secularism in Lebanon
Sectarianism in Lebanon
Secularist movement in Lebanon

References

Further reading

https://www.lorientlejour.com/article/1039085/la-laicite-optionnelle-est-un-droit-constitutionnel.html La laïcité optionnelle est un droit constitutionnel, par Jacques MACHAALANI, 7/3/2017 OLJ Retrieved 2017 03 09

http://fritanke.no/index.php?page=vis_nyhet&NyhetID=7022  Sekulært opprør i Libanon av Even Gran Publisert: 28.04.2010 kl 08:12 Oppdatert: 28.04.2010 kl 09:58 OPPDATERT 30.4 Retrieved 2017 03 09

http://majlis-remomm.fr/date/2010/04 Liban: Un laïcitomètre dans le rouge. 29 avril 2010 André Sleiman Retrieved 2017 03 09

http://www.atheologie.ca/blogue-012/ La libre pensée au Liban, par David Rand 2014 11 19 Retrieved 2017 03 09

http://www.secularism.org.uk/blog/2012/05/asking-the-impossible-lebanons-march-for-secularism Asking the impossible? Lebanon's march for secularism Posted: Tue, 8 May 2012 16:38 by Alex Rowell 2017 03 09

http://www.20minutes.fr/monde/diaporama-1113-photo-503705-laique-pride-a-beyrouth Publié le 25 Avril 2010 Retrieved 2017 03 09

http://leclairon.blog.lemonde.fr/2010/02/08/liban-sortir-du-systeme-confessionnel/ Liban : sortir du système confessionnel ? 8 février 2010 Retrieved 2017 03 09

http://savatier.blog.lemonde.fr/2012/09/24/liban-2012-26-le-retour-des-vieux-demons/ Liban 2012 (2/6) : Le retour des vieux démons ? 24 septembre 2012, par Thierry Savatier Retrieved 2017 03 09

Electoral reform
Organizations with year of establishment missing
Political advocacy groups in Lebanon
Protests in Lebanon
Reform movements
Secularism in Lebanon
Secularist organizations
Women in Lebanon
Women's rights in the Middle East